The Cluny Power Station is a conventional hydroelectric power station located in the Central Highlands region of Tasmania, Australia. The power station is situated on the Lower River Derwent catchment and is owned and operated by Hydro Tasmania.

Technical details
Part of the Derwent scheme that comprises eleven hydroelectric power stations, the Cluny Power Station is the tenth power station in the scheme. The power station is located aboveground below Cluny Lagoon, a small storage created by the concrete gravity Cluny Dam on the Derwent River. The facilities at the Cluny Power Station are simple and include the dam, intake structure with intake gate designed to cut off full flow, a short penstock which is integral with the dam, power station building, generator equipment and associated facilities.

Within the station building, the turbine has a four-bladed runner and concrete spiral casing. Pre-stressed cables passing through the stay vanes anchor the spiral casing and form part of the station foundation. No inlet valve is installed in the station. The station output, estimated to be  annually, is fed to TasNetworks' transmission grid via an 11 kV/220 kV Siemens generator transformer to the outdoor switchyard.

Water discharged from the Cluny Power Station flows into the River Derwent.

See also 

List of power stations in Tasmania

References

External links
Hydro Tasmania page on the Lower Derwent

Energy infrastructure completed in 1968
Hydroelectric power stations in Tasmania
Central Highlands (Tasmania)